The Medicine Hat Ocean is an inferred small ocean basin that closed in the Proterozoic as the Hearne craton and Wyoming craton collided.

See also

 List of ancient oceans
 Geology of Wyoming
 Geology of Montana

References

Historical oceans
Oceanography
Proterozoic North America
Geology of North America